Back on My B.S. is the eighth studio album by American rapper Busta Rhymes. It was released on May 19, 2009 through Flipmode and Universal Motown.

Background
The album was originally going to be called Before Hell Freezes Over, but went through several name changes (including Back on My Bullshit, Blessed and B.O.M.B.) before being finalized as Back on My B.S.. The release date changed many times, mostly due to Busta Rhymes' release from Aftermath Entertainment and Interscope Records. The album was originally supposed to come out as early as December 4, 2007 but went through many projected release dates before an official release date of May 19, 2009.

Release and promotion 
During an interview with MTV News, Busta Rhymes mentioned that he will be working with longtime collaborators as well as some people he's never had the chance to work with before. He said: 

In May 2008, news spread of a tracklisting confirming these tracks, stating the album would be titled Blessed and would feature a holographic cover.

During an interview with FLOW 93.5 in Toronto, Kardinal Offishall stated that he would appear on a track which would also feature Akon. Kardinal Offishall did not appear on the album, but Akon did. At a private listening session in Manhattan, Busta announced that guest appearances on the album would include Mary J. Blige, Jamie Foxx, Common, Nicole Scherzinger, Akon, T.I., Lil Wayne, Ludacris, The Game, American rock band Linkin Park, T-Pain, and Swizz Beatz.

The first single was originally going to be "Watch Ya Mouth" featuring Swizz Beatz, but then it was changed and will not appear on the album and was dubbed as a street single. "Don't Touch Me (Throw da Water on 'em)" then became the first single, but was changed and simply became a promo single.  Although not confirmed to be on the final release of the album, Rhymes teamed up with Travis Barker for one of the latter's underground hit "rock remixes", with the homemade YouTube video having more views than the official single video. Linkin Park also collaborated on the second promo single, "We Made It". The video was shot April 15, 2008. The video for "We Made It" premiered on BET and Yahoo! Music on April 29, 2008. Pharrell did 3 tracks with Busta Rhymes for his new album, one including "G-Stro" "G-Stro" did not appear on the album, but was included on the Fast & Furious soundtrack. Only one made the final cut.

Busta Rhymes premiered the video for "I Got Bass" on November 24 and has cameos from DJ Scratch, Bangladesh, Fabolous, Alfamega, Swizz Beatz and the Flipmode Squad. Hip Hop producer/singer Ron Browz collaborated on the song "Arab Money". The music video debuted on BET's 106 & Park on December 2. It features cameos from Rick Ross, Spliff Star, DJ Drama, Jim Jones, Juelz Santana, DJ Khaled, Akon, Sean Paul, Soulja Boy Tell 'Em, Kardinal Offishall, Ace Hood, Shawty Lo, Paul Wall among many others. The first part of the official remix of "Arab Money" was leaked on November 27. It features Diddy, Ron Browz, Swizz Beatz, T-Pain, Akon and Lil Wayne. The second part was leaked on December 13 and features Ron Browz, Rick Ross, Reek Da Villian, Spliff Star, N.O.R.E. and Red Cafe. The third part was leaked on December 20 features Ron Browz, Juelz Santana, Jim Jones and Jadakiss. All three are the official remix of "Arab Money."

A video for "Respect My Conglomerate" has been shot and the song has been released as a promo CD single. The song is also rumored to be the official third single. However, the video version features Lil Wayne in place of Young Jeezy. The track is featured as an iTunes bonus track on Jadakiss' The Last Kiss. Upon release, both "We Made It" with Linkin Park and "Don't Touch Me (Throw da Water on 'em)" were not included on the final version of the album. Due to its graphic nature, the track "Kill Dem", which features Pharrell and Tosh, is not speculated to be a single. However, the song has received airplay on New York radio stations. The fourth single is "World Go Round", featuring Estelle.  The video of the song has been shot and released. The album is notable for being Busta Rhymes' first solo album in 11 years not to feature production from J Dilla, who died in 2006.

Reception

Critical response to the album was mixed. According to Metacritic, the album scored a 60 out of 100, indicating "mixed or average reviews". Entertainment Weekly wrote an unfavorable review, saying, "All things considered, Busta should probably try including a little less B.S. the next time he comes back." Slant Magazine also wrote a negative review, stating that, "More often than not, Busta is content to recycle well-worn material, hoping that enough polish and guest-star participation will wick away the album's dusty content. They don't, leaving B.S. as nothing more than filler." The album was named the most "disappointing album" of 2009 by Hip-Hop news website HipHopDX. However XXL, a hip-hop magazine, gave the album a high rating of XL (4 out of five stars), stating that, "Bussa-Bus stays true to form, meshing the same witty concepts and dope production he has been known for his entire career."

Commercial performance
The album debuted at number five on the Billboard 200 with first-week sales of 59,000 copies.

Track listing 
The track listing was confirmed by two major retail sites.

Release history

References

External links
 
 
 

Busta Rhymes albums
2009 albums
Conglomerate (record label) albums
Universal Motown Records albums
Albums produced by Cool & Dre
Albums produced by Danja (record producer)
Albums produced by Mr. Porter
Albums produced by DJ Scratch
Albums produced by Focus...
Albums produced by JellyRoll
Albums produced by Ron Browz
Albums produced by Needlz
Albums produced by Pharrell Williams
Albums produced by Ty Fyffe
Albums produced by Don Cannon